Pavese may refer to:

Languages
 Pavese dialect, a variety of Southwestern Lombard language

People
 Paves, troubadour
 Cesare Pavese, Italian writer and poet

Places of Italy
 Pavese (territory), a territory of the Province of Pavia, Lombardy
 Oltrepò Pavese, a territory of the Province of Pavia, Lombardy

Other
 Zuppa pavese, a soup